The Torneo Internacional de Tenis Femenino "Conchita Martínez" – Trofeo Hinaco Monzón is a tournament for professional female tennis players. The event is classified as a $25,000 ITF Women's Circuit tournament. It has been held on outdoor hardcourts annually in Monzón, Spain, since 2003. The event was previously a $75,000 tournament from 2007 to 2010. The 2012 edition of the tournament was not held.

Past finals

Singles

Doubles

External links
  
 ITF search

ITF Women's World Tennis Tour
Hard court tennis tournaments
Tennis tournaments in Spain
Recurring sporting events established in 2003